The Deep Blue Organ Trio was an American, Chicago based jazz organ trio, made up of jazz guitarist Bobby Broom, Hammond B3 organist Chris Foreman and drummer Greg Rockingham.  In their individual careers they have performed and recorded with many prominent musicians in the field of jazz and blues.   The group disbanded in 2013 after opening for a few Steely Dan summer tours.

Although they played together beginning in 1992, they officially formed this co-led group in 2000 and recorded four albums, two for Delmark Records in 2004 and 2006 and two for Origin Records, one in 2007 and one in 2011.  The trio displayed elements of the soul jazz and hard bop styles of jazz, and utilized blues music as well as the rhythm & blues and funk music mediums in their music.

Discography
 Deep Blue Bruise (Delmark, 2004)
 Goin' to Town: Live at the Green Mill (Delmark, 2006)
 Folk Music (Origin, 2007)
 Wonderful! (Origin, 2011)

DVDs
 Goin' to Town: Live at the Green Mill (Delmark, 2006)

References

American jazz ensembles from Illinois
Delmark Records artists
Hard bop ensembles